Wright Post (February 19, 1766 – June 14, 1828) was an American surgeon. Post was born at North Hempstead, Long Island on February 19, 1766. He studied medicine for six years in New York and London, and began to practice in New York in 1786.  In London he became one of favorite pupils of the revolutionary surgeon John Hunter. In 1792 he became a professor of surgery, and afterward of anatomy and physiology, in Columbia College.  He visited the celebrated schools of Europe, and returned in 1793 with a splendid anatomical cabinet.  In 1813 he became a professor of anatomy in the College of Physicians and Surgeons, and was its president from 1821 to 1826.  Post was one of the pioneers among American surgeons, and was long remembered as a successful operator, especially in the ligation of vital arteries. He died at his home in Throggs Neck, New York on June 14, 1828.

References

External links

 

Columbia University faculty
American surgeons
1766 births
1828 deaths
Bayley family
18th-century surgeons
18th-century American physicians
19th-century surgeons
19th-century American physicians
People from North Hempstead, New York